"Act Break" is the first segment of the eighth episode from the first season (1985–86) of the television series The Twilight Zone. In this segment, a playwright dying from a heart attack gives his partner a magical relic which grants the bearer one wish.

Plot
Maury is a playwright who is behind in his rent. Though he boasts that when his latest play is completed he will have more than enough money to pay his bills, inwardly he realizes that much as he and his longtime writing partner Harry enjoy writing together, their ongoing lack of success is primarily due to their mediocre talent. During an intense joint writing session, Harry dies of a heart attack. Harry, in his last moments, hands Maury an ancient relic and explains that each bearer of this relic gets one wish only, and he has already used his, so he needs Maury to use his wish to bring him back to life. Still fretting over his financial troubles, however, Maury instead wishes to have the greatest playwright ever as his new partner.

Maury is transported back in time to the Elizabethan era into the identity of a servant to William Shakespeare. Intuiting that history cannot be changed and therefore any work he does with Shakespeare will be uncredited, Maury regrets not using the wish to save Harry. Intrigued by Maury's relic and his offhand summary of Hamlet, a play Shakespeare has yet to write, Shakespeare takes the relic and says to Maury, "I wish for you to write with me." The relic fills Maury's mind with every line of every play that Shakespeare wrote. Resigned to his fate, he sits at a desk and begins to write Hamlet from memory.

External links
 

1985 American television episodes
The Twilight Zone (1985 TV series season 1) episodes
Cultural depictions of William Shakespeare
Television episodes about time travel
Television set in Tudor England

fr:Le Nègre de Shakespeare